Zheng Ji may refer to.

Zheng Ji (general) (died 49 BC), Protector General of the Western Regions during the Han dynasty
Zheng Ji (biochemist) (1900–2010), Chinese biochemist and nutritionist

See also 
 Zheng Jie (born 1983), Chinese tennis player